The 19335/19336 Gandhidham - Indore Weekly Express is an express train belonging to Western Railway zone that runs between  and . It is currently being operated with 19335/19336 train numbers on a weekly basis.

Coach Composition

The train has standard ICF rakes with max speed of 110 kmph. The train consists of 16 coaches :

 1 AC II Tier
 2 AC III Tier
 7 Sleeper Coaches
 4 General Unreserved
 2 Seating cum Luggage Rake

Service 

The 19335/Gandhidham - Indore Weekly Express runs with an average speed of 46 km/h and completes 806 km in 17 hrs 25 mins.

The 19336/Indore - Gandhidham Weekly Express runs with an average speed of 51 km/h and completes 806 km in 15 hrs 45 mins.

Route and halts 

The important halts of the train are:

See also 

 Gandhidham Junction railway station
 Indore Junction railway station

References 

Express trains in India
Railway services introduced in 2019
Transport in Gandhidham
Transport in Indore
Rail transport in Gujarat
Rail transport in Madhya Pradesh